Cleopatra V (died  or ) was a Ptolemaic Queen of Egypt. She is the only surely attested wife of Ptolemy XII. Her only known child is Berenice IV, but she was also probably the mother of Cleopatra VII. It is unclear if she died around the time of Cleopatra VII's birth in 69 BC, or if it was her or a daughter named Cleopatra VI who co-ruled Ptolemaic Egypt with Berenice IV in 58–57 BC during the political exile of Ptolemy XII to Rome. No written records about Cleopatra V exist after 57 BC and two years later Berenice IV was overthrown by Ptolemy XII, his throne restored with Roman military aid.

Descent and marriage
Because of the poor body of source material Cleopatra V is a very obscure member of the Ptolemaic dynasty. Only a few ascertained facts about her are known. Many aspects of her life are the subject of controversial theories. In all known ancient sources she is given the byname Tryphaena. She may have borne this name before accession to the throne when she assumed the traditional royal name Cleopatra. In some modern specialist literature Cleopatra Tryphaena, wife of Ptolemy XII, is referred to as Cleopatra VI. The historian of classical antiquity Werner Huß refers to her as Cleopatra VII Tryphaena.

The parentage of Cleopatra V is not recorded. She may have been a legitimate or illegitimate daughter of Ptolemy IX or the legitimate daughter of Ptolemy X. It is mentioned that in 88 BC, Ptolemy X Alexander fled Egypt with his wife Berenice III and his daughter. Cleopatra Tryphaena might be this unnamed daughter. 

Cleopatra V is first mentioned in 79 BC in two papyri. One of these papyri dates from January 17, 79 BC. In that year she married Ptolemy XII, king of Egypt. They received divine worship as theoí Philopátores kai Philádelphoi (father-, brother- and sister-loving gods). Cleopatra’s Egyptian titles, found primarily at Edfu and Philae, include Daughter of Re, Female Ruler, and Mistress of Two Lands.

Death and identity
It is unclear how long Cleopatra V lived, and with which mentions of Cleopatra Tryphaena in the historical record she should be identified, as the numbering used to distinguish the Ptolemies is a modern invention. Cleopatra Tryphaena V vanished around the time Cleopatra VII was born (69 BC): her name begins to disappear from monuments and papyri, and there is a papyrus of Ptolemy XII from 69 BC that does not mention her but would be expected to do so had she still been alive.

There is some indication that Cleopatra may have died in 69 BC — she may have died in childbirth or was possibly murdered. Should she really have died that early, then the Cleopatra Tryphaena who is mentioned — after the expulsion of Ptolemy XII — as co-ruler of Egypt (together with Berenice IV) in 58 and 57 BC, and died around 57 BC, must be her daughter, numbered by some historians as Cleopatra VI Tryphaena. This is also supported by Porphyry.

On the other hand, there is a dedication on the Temple of Edfu from December 5, 57 BC that inscribes Cleopatra Tryphaena's name alongside Ptolemy XII's (who however was not present in Egypt at that time), which would have meant the king's wife rather than daughter and would be unlikely had Ptolemy XII's wife really died already twelve years earlier. Thus some, though not all, modern historians consider Cleopatra V to be identical with the purported Cleopatra VI Tryphaena, and have her living to c. 57 BC. This would comport with the account by Strabo, who reports Ptolemy XII to have had only three daughters; these can reliably be identified as Berenice IV, Cleopatra VII, and Arsinoe IV as the king's daughters, so that there would not be left any room for a Cleopatra VI. Werner Huss assumes, that quarrels erupted between Cleopatra V and Ptolemy XII in 69 BC and that as a result of these disputes Cleopatra V fell in disgrace and was compelled to resign.

Cleopatra V was probably the mother of Cleopatra VII. Michael Grant comes to the conclusion that "on the whole" it seems most likely Cleopatra V was the mother of Cleopatra VII, noting that had Cleopatra VII been illegitimate, her "numerous Roman enemies would have revealed this to the world." He continues we should rule out the hypothesis Cleopatra VII was conceived by Ptolemy XII's second wife-to-be while Cleopatra V was on the scene, and that if this unknown second wife would have been Cleopatra VII's mother and later made "queen legitimized", Cleopatra VII would still have been considered a bastard and "her Roman foes would not have missed the hint." Duane W. Roller speculates that Cleopatra could have been the daughter of a theoretical half-Macedonian-Greek, half-Egyptian woman belonging to a family of priests dedicated to Ptah and was "only technically illegitimate" (however, he contends that whatever Cleopatra's ancestry, she valued her Greek Ptolemaic heritage the most), but notes if this unknown woman was not Cleopatra's mother, then Cleopatra V would be her mother.  Part of his argument is based on Strabo's mention of Ptolemy XII's having only three daughters, Berenice being the only legitimate one. But as Grant notes that, of all the attacks on Cleopatra VII, her being illegitimate is not among them, and that it is only mentioned in a casual statement by Strabo.

Most scholars agree that Berenice IV was a daughter of Cleopatra V. A different wife of Ptolemy XII may have been the mother of the younger siblings of Cleopatra VII, that is Arsinoe IV, Ptolemy XIII and Ptolemy XIV. However, Christopher Bennett thinks that Cleopatra V was the mother of all known children of Ptolemy XII. In 55 BC, upon his return to Egypt from exile with Roman military aid, Ptolemy XII had his rival daughter Berenice IV executed for usurping his throne.

Notes

References
 
.

.

.

.

External links
 Genealogy of Ptolemaic Dynasty 

1st-century BC Egyptian people
1st-century BC Pharaohs
1st-century BC rulers in Africa
1st-century BC women rulers
60s BC deaths
90s BC births
Ancient Egyptian queens regnant
Female pharaohs
Pharaohs of the Ptolemaic dynasty
Ptolemaic princesses